The 2011 Essendon Football Club season is the club's 113th season in the Australian Football League (AFL).

Essendon won 11 matches, drew one and lost 10 matches in the 2011 season.

Their season begun with a 55-point thumping of triple-preliminary finalists the  before a narrow five-point defeat to  followed.

Amidst this, Essendon lost the second quarter in surprising circumstances, before going on to finish the job to record its first win over a side featuring Gary Ablett since 2005. Only two more wins would follow, against the West Coast Eagles and Brisbane Lions in the weeks after the Suns annihilation.

Essendon pulled off the boilover of the season when they defeated the previously unbeaten  by four points in Round 15, 2011, without their injured skipper, Jobe Watson. It was their first win over the Cats in almost six years, having not beaten them since Round 18, 2005. However, it was just their second win over Geelong since 2003, leaving them with one of the worst records against Geelong in recent times.

Essendon won by one point after a post-siren shot by Sydney's Adam Goodes drifted to the left. Round 23 saw Essendon qualifying the finals for the second time in two years, when it defeated Port Adelaide by 7 points at Etihad Stadium. It ended a seven-year winless run against the side, having not beaten them since Round 18, 2004.

Essendon's elimination final against  was lost by 62 points, ending what was otherwise a promising first year for James Hird in the Essendon coaching role.

Squad

Trades

In

Out

Drafts

National Draft

Rookie Draft

^ Denotes NSW AFL scholarship elevation

Pre-Season Draft

Results

Pre-season (NAB Cup)

Round 1

Quarter-finals

Semi-finals

Grand Final

Home and Away season

Round 1

Round 2

Round 3

Round 4

Round 5

Round 6

Ladder

Ladder progression

Tribunal cases

Season Statistics

Home attendance

Season Financials

Annual Report 2011

Notes
"Points" refers to carry-over points accrued following the sanction. For example, 154.69 points draw a one-match suspension, with 54.69 carry-over points (for every 100 points, a one-match suspension is given).

References

External links
 Official website of the Essendon Football Club
 Official website of the Australian Football League 
 2011 season scores and results at AFL Tables
 2011 Essendon player statistics at AFL Tables

2011
Essendon Football Club